Judo at the 2013 Southeast Asian Games took place at Zayyarthiri Indoor Stadium, Naypyidaw, Myanmar between December 18–21.

Medalists

Kata

Men

Women

Medal table

Controversy
Indonesian Judo team refuses one silver and two bronze medals awarded to them as a protest of alleged referee unfairness in Judo 90 kg final match between Horas Manurung from Indonesia against Myanmar athlete Zin Linn Aung in Zeyar Thiri Indoor Stadium, Naypyitaw, Myanmar, Saturday, 21 December 2013. According to Indonesian team Judo coach, Tsuneo Sengoku, the referee should stop the match when the host athlete Zin Linn Aung locked Manurung's shoulder in illegal foul moves, but the referee decide to continue the match resulting in the defeat and injury of Indonesian athlete. The locking movement in Judo are allowed on hand and arms parts, but not allowed on upper arm and shoulder as it could cause injuries.

References

2013 Southeast Asian Games events
2013
Asian Games, Southeast
2013 Asian Games, Southeast